IMX may refer to:

 IMX (TV series), or Interactive Music Exchange, an American music television program from 2003 to 2004
 IMx, an American R&B group, also known as Immature
 IMx (album), 2001 album
 i.MX, a family of Freescale Semiconductor (now part of NXP) proprietary microprocessors
 IMX Resources, a dual-listed iron ore mining and base and precious metals exploration company based in Perth, Western Australia
 IMX-101, a high-performance insensitive explosive
 MPEG IMX, a digital video format for Betacam
 Zimex Aviation, an airline based in Glattbrugg, Switzerland, by ICAO code